John Howard Angas (5 October 1823 – 17 May 1904) was an Australian pioneer, politician and philanthropist.

Early life and education
John Howard Angas was the second son of George Fife Angas and his wife Rosetta née French. He was born in Newcastle upon Tyne. There were six siblings including Sarah Lindsay Evans, temperance activist, and George French Angas, artist. When around four years old, John was boarded out with a couple in Hutton, Essex where his parents were living. He later attended the University of London for short time.

When 18 years of age, Angas was told by his father that he must prepare himself to go to South Australia to take charge of his father's land in the Barossa Valley. As part of his preparation he learned German, so that he might be able to converse with the German settlers and studied land surveying.

Career
He left England on 15 April 1843 and was still only in his twentieth year when he arrived in South Australia. The colony was in financial difficulties, and he needed all his courage, caution, and good judgment. With better times the estate began to pay, good shorthorn cattle and merino sheep were purchased, and when his father arrived in 1851 it was realized that the property was now a valuable one.

In 1854, the younger Angas sailed to England on a holiday and on 10 May 1855 was married to Susanne Collins (c. 1834 – 14 April 1910) at Bowdon near Manchester. 

They returned in 1855 and settled at Collingrove near his father's estate. Country life did not agree with Mrs. Angas however, and on their next visit to the England, she remained there, and for six years her husband lived alternately there and in South Australia, supervising his pastoral interests. A son Charles Howard Angas was born at his grandmother's house in Upper Clapton, England, on 21 April 1861, and his sister Lilian Gertrude Angas on 13 December 1862. In May 1863, John and Susanne Angas returned to South Australia on the steamer Pera, with their two infant children. The family was in England again in 1879 when news of the death of John's father George Fife Angas was received, and they immediately returned to South Australia.

When Angas was developing the land at Barossa, he had to make important decisions while quite young, and was a fine type of early pioneer. Like his brother, George French Angas, he had some talent as an artist, but the responsibilities thrown on him in early life prevented him from developing it to the same extent.

In the 1860s, Angas purchased from his father the fine residence "Prospect Hall" on Torrens Road at the corner overlooking the Park Lands (not to be confused with J. B. Graham's "Prospect House", aka "Graham's Castle" on Prospect Road, Prospect). which served as his home while parliament was sitting. He was anxious to preserve the amenity of the area, and went to some pains to dissuade tradesmen such as the Champion Brothers from establishing disagreeable industries nearby.

He became a breeder of Hackney ponies, Shorthorn cattle and Merino and Lincoln sheep, and is known to have paid as much as £1000 for a single ram. The prizes won by him at shows for livestock and wheat were numerous. He was a member of the Royal Agricultural and Horticultural Society and its president from 1886 to 1888. In 1871, he was elected a member of the South Australian Legislative Assembly for Barossa but resigned in 1875 on account of his health. In 1887, he re-entered politics as a member of the South Australian Legislative Council and remained a member for seven years.

Philanthropy
He made numerous gifts to all kinds of charitable movements, religious institutions, and hospitals, and gave £10,000 to the University of Adelaide to found scholarships. Among his charitable giving, a lasting memorial to Angas was his endowment enabling the building of a house (one of 64) at Dr Barnardo’s Home, The Village Home, Barkingside, Ilford, Essex. It was known as John Howard Angas Cottage and for about 100 years was home, at any one time, to 12 of the children in Barnardo’s care.  Angas Cottage was one of many houses at The Village to be demolished to make way for a Tesco Supermarket and its car park on Cranbrook Road, Barkingside.

Death
He died on 17 May 1904 and was survived by his wife, a son and a daughter.

Angas Chair of Chemistry
In 1884, Angas gave £6,000 to the University of Adelaide which, along with a "Covenant and Declaration of Trust", established a "Chair or Professorship of Chemistry".

The Angas Professors have been:

Notes

References

Sources
The Adelaide Register, 18 May 1904
E. Hodder, George Fife Angas

Burke's Colonial Gentry, 1891.

1823 births
1904 deaths
20th-century Australian philanthropists
19th-century Australian businesspeople
Members of the South Australian Legislative Council
Members of the South Australian House of Assembly
Settlers of South Australia
Adelaide Club
19th-century Australian politicians
Politicians from Newcastle upon Tyne
People from Hutton, Essex
19th-century Australian philanthropists
English emigrants to colonial Australia